Cognite AS is a Norwegian software as a service company with headquarters in Oslo, Norway and offices  in Tokyo, Houston and Austin. The company provides software and industrial internet of things (IIoT) services to industrial companies.

Overview 
Founded in 2016, Cognite offers a data operations and contextualization platform that puts raw data into real-world industrial context. The company's main software product is Cognite Data Fusion (CDF). CDF is a cloud-based industrial DataOps platform that supports the digital transformation of heavy-asset industries such as oil and gas, power and utilities, renewable energy and manufacturing. Cognite's Notable customers  have included Aker BP, BP, Saudi Aramco, Alfa Laval, Statnett, Mitsubishi Heavy Industries, and TechnipFMC.

In 2021, Cognite raised $150 million in a Series B investment by TCV. According to the 2021 report of Nasdaq, Cognite was valued at $1.6 billion.

In February 2022, it was announced that Aramco Overseas, a subsidiary of Saudi Aramco, had acquired a 7.4% stake in Cognite by purchasing 100% of Aker BP’s shares in the company. Aker BP was Cognite's largest customer.

In April 2022, Girish Rishi, former CEO of Blue Yonder, succeeded John Markus Lervik as CEO. Lervik shifted to the position of chief development and strategy officer.

References

External links
 Official website

Business services companies of Norway
Computer companies of Norway
Information technology consulting firms of Norway
Information technology companies of Norway
Outsourcing companies
Cloud computing providers
Software companies of Norway
Software companies established in 2016